Muli is a former village development committee in Achham District in the Seti Zone of western Nepal. 
टाकाबाडा is the one of the best ward of Muli VDC
According to the 1991 Nepal census, the village had a population of 2352 living in 462 houses. At the time of the 2001 Nepal census, the population was 2545, of which 39% was literate. Muli now is part of Kamalbazar Municipality which was established in 2014.

References

Populated places in Achham District
Village development committees in Achham District